Dušan Veškovac (Serbian Cyrillic: Душан Вешковац; born 16 March 1986) is a retired Serbian professional footballer who played as a defender.

Career
Veškovac started out at Napredak Kruševac, making his senior debuts in the 2003–04 First League of Serbia and Montenegro. He also played for Obilić and Borac Čačak, before moving abroad to Swiss Challenge League side Wohlen in the 2007 winter transfer window. While in Switzerland, Veškovac also represented two Super League clubs, namely Luzern and Young Boys, collecting 150 appearances in the top flight.

In January 2014, Veškovac was transferred to French club Toulouse on a three-and-a-half-year contract. He was loaned to newly promoted Ligue 1 side Troyes in August 2015.

In August 2017, Veškovac returned to his homeland and joined his parent club Napredak Kruševac on a free transfer. He retired at the end of 2019.

References

External links
 
 
 

Association football defenders
BSC Young Boys players
Expatriate footballers in France
Expatriate footballers in Switzerland
FC Luzern players
FC Wohlen players
First League of Serbia and Montenegro players
FK Borac Čačak players
FK Napredak Kruševac players
FK Obilić players
Ligue 1 players
Serbian expatriate footballers
Serbian expatriate sportspeople in France
Serbian expatriate sportspeople in Switzerland
Serbian First League players
Serbian footballers
Serbian SuperLiga players
Sportspeople from Kruševac
Swiss Challenge League players
Swiss Super League players
Toulouse FC players
ES Troyes AC players
1986 births
Living people